Licensure means a restricted practice or a restriction on the use of an occupational title, requiring a license. A license created under a "practice act" requires a license before performing a certain activity, such as driving a car on public roads. A license created under a "title act" restricts the use of a given occupational title to licensees, but anyone can perform the activity itself under a less restricted title. For example, in Oregon, anyone can practice counseling, but only licensees can call themselves "Licensed Professional Counselors."  Thus depending on the type of law,
practicing without a license may carry civil or criminal penalties or may be perfectly legal.  For some occupations and professions, licensing is often granted through a professional body or a licensing board composed of practitioners who oversee the applications for licenses. This often involves accredited training and examinations, but varies a great deal for different activities and in different countries.

Occupational licensing has the strongest public support for activities whose incompetent execution would be a health or safety threat to the public, such as practicing medicine.  Licensing of low-risk businesses like florists and hair braiding salons is more controversial because licensing is inherently a form of restraint of trade.  It creates a barrier to entry preventing some people from practicing the profession, benefiting existing licensees by reducing competition.  This can harm consumers by raising prices and reducing innovation by new market entrants, and may slow overall economic growth.  Competition law can conflict with licensing practices if the licensing body favors its own licensees in ways that do not clearly protect the public.

Alternatives to individual licensure include requiring that at least one person on a premises be licensed and oversee unlicensed practitioners, permitting of the business overall, random health and safety inspections, general consumer protection laws, and deregulation in favor of voluntary private certifications or free market mechanisms such as customer review sites.

Types 
In the United States and Canada, licensing  (the term registration is sometimes used) is usually required by law to work in a particular profession or to obtain a privilege such as to drive a car or truck. Many other privileges and professions require a license, generally from the state or provincial government, in order to ensure that the public will not be harmed by the incompetence of the practitioners, and to limit supply to incumbent practitioners and thus increase wages.

Examples of professions that require licensure in some jurisdictions include: actuary, architect, certified public accountant, electrician, engineering, general contractors, financial analyst, geologists, hedge fund manager, insurance agent, interior design, investment banker, licensed professional counselor, nurse, physical therapist, plumber, private investigator, psychologist, landscape architect, lawyer, nutritionist, physician, real estate broker, speech-language pathologist, school counselor, social worker, stockbroker, surveyor, and teacher.

Licensure is similar to professional certification, and sometimes synonymous (such as in the case with teacher licensure/certification); however, certification is an employment qualification and not a legal requirement for practicing a profession. In many cases, an individual must complete certain steps, such as training, acquiring an academic degree in a particular area of study, and/or passing an exam, before becoming eligible to receive their license. There are various resources available to assist professionals with the completion of these steps. Professional associations are often a tremendous resource to individuals looking to obtain a special level of certification or licensure. Upon the successful attainment of a license, individuals append an acronym to their name, such as CPA (Certified Public Accountant) or LPD and PI (Private Detective and Investigator) PE (Professional Engineer).

In the United Kingdom, licensing as a form of professional regulation predominated in the centuries before 1900. It has largely given way to memberships of professional bodies. This usually involves registration with a professional body and the granting of grades of "associateship," "membership" or "fellowship" of such a body. Gaining membership of such bodies is usually restricted solely to those who pass additional examinations after university graduation. United Kingdom examples of professional bodies include: MRINA (internationally qualified to practice member of the Royal Institute of Naval Architects), MRIBA Royal Institute of British Architects), MIMechE (Member of the Institution of Mechanical Engineers), MICE (Member of the Institution of Civil Engineers), LRCP (licentiate of the Royal College of Physicians), MRCP (member of the Royal College of Physicians), MIET (Member of the Institution of Engineering and Technology).

License renewal 
In places, licensure may still be a lifelong privilege, but increasingly nowadays, it requires periodic review by peers and renewal. It is very common for license renewal to depend, at least in part, on academia. In the United Kingdom such regular upgrading of skills is often termed continuous professional development, or CPD. In many professions this is fast becoming a standard, mandatory and annual requirement. For example, in the US, educators are subject to state re-certification requirements in order to continue teaching. The No Child Left Behind Act of 2001, enacted to improve performance in US schools, has led to an intensification of license requirements for both beginning and experienced educators. In the case of UK medical practitioners, the government has recently proposed that they should all be legally required to produce formal proof, every five years, that they are upgrading their standard of practise. This tightening of the UK medical licensing system has largely been a response to public and government unease about a series of recent and well-publicised cases of alleged medical incompetence, including the Harold Shipman case, the Alder Hey organs scandal and those involving David Southall, Rodney Ledward and Richard Neale.
Such cases of medical malpractice in the 1990s are widely considered to have inspired the government to tighten professional control of medical practitioners and monitor the quality of their practice for their entire working life. One qualification for life is no longer deemed sufficient. Consequently, medical licenses can now be withdrawn when evidence of serious malpractice emerges. Currently, though such reviews of CPD are entirely voluntary, some form of professional development is already strongly encouraged within the medical profession.

Public trust and safety 
Restrictions to employment without licensure can prevent people with criminal records or severe mental health issues from working in occupations that require public trust. Occupations of or affected by the gambling industry, may be restricted by licensure, such as a racing secretary in horseracing, or people in the boxing, mixed martial arts, and professional wrestling industry. People whose occupations put them in physical contact with the public might also be restricted by licensure, including a barber, cosmetologist, or massage therapist. Occupations that bring a person into the home might also be screened through licensure, including a chauffeur, landscape architect, or arborist.

Criticism

Exclusion of competition 
Historically, in the professionalization process by which trades have transformed themselves 
into true professions, licensing fast became the method of choice in obtaining the occupational closure required by barring competition from entry to the rites and privileges of a professional group. This was initially the preferred route of regulation whether for physicians, lawyers, the clergy, accountants, bankers, scientists or architects. However, licensing has given way to membership of professional bodies, as a means of excluding competition.

Restrictions on location of work 
Individuals practicing a profession in one jurisdiction where no license is required, or where licensing requirements are more lax, face problems with employment when moving to a jurisdiction with more stringent licensing. This can be particularly burdensome on families where one spouse has no choice with regard to location of work (such as military servicemembers), when the second spouse is in a licensed profession. These problems can be avoided by harmonizing laws across jurisdictions, or with reciprocity agreements where licenses from one jurisdiction are recognized in others.

Liberal and libertarian criticism 

Licensure restricts entry into professional careers in medicine, nursing, law, business, pharmacy, psychology, social work, teaching, engineering, surveying, and architecture. Advocates claim that licensure protects the consumer through the application of professional, educational and/or ethical standards of practice. Economist Milton Friedman opposed this practice, believing that licensure effectively raises professional salary by placing limits on the supply of specific occupations. "It is hard to regard altruistic concern for their customers as the primary motive behind their determined efforts to get legal power to decide who may be a plumber."

Restricting entry by licensing is arguably a convenient and effective method of maintaining the high standards, high status and elite privileges of a profession as well as acting to eliminate competition from those who provide a cheaper but (allegedly) sub-standard service. Organizations such as the American Medical Association were explicitly set up to restrict the number of practitioners. However, libertarians like Milton Friedman have argued that this process is counterproductive as it seriously restricts the number of active professionals working in society and thus unnecessarily inhibits the working of a free enterprise economy. A 2011 U.S. study estimated that occupational licenses result in 2.8 million fewer jobs, and cost the economy $203 billion per year.  The number of jobs requiring a professional licensed represents an increasing fraction of the workforce, from 5% in 1950 to 22% in 2010s. Critics say that low-income consumers, who pay higher prices than required for the level of quality they might require, and low-income job seekers, are disproportionately affected.

Skepticism regarding necessity 
Many professions involving risk to the public do not require professional licenses. For example, chefs are generally unlicensed, though opening a restaurant may require permits, inspection, and employee training or instructional signage.  Becoming a brain surgeon typically only requires a medical license; the substantial additional training and experience required to perform this operation competently is managed by the hospitals who employ the surgeons.

In the United States, critics have pointed out that (as of 2018) only 60 professions are licensed by all 50 states, but about 1100 by at least one state, including tour guides, bartenders, and interior designers. If many professions are functioning satisfactorily unlicensed in the majority of states, this implies to critics that the licensing is unnecessary for consumer protection.  The administrations of both President Obama and President Trump have tried to pressure state and local authorities to reduce overly burdensome licensing requirements. Excessive requirements include requiring hair braiders to have a full cosmetology license and learn about many unrelated tasks, and requiring casket salespersons to be full licensed funeral directors.

Lawsuits 
In the United States, under the Parker immunity doctrine established by the 1943 Supreme Court case Parker v. Brown, state governments are generally exempt from federal antitrust laws.  However, the 2015 decision in North Carolina State Board of Dental Examiners v. FTC held that a state occupational licensing board that was primarily composed of persons active in the market it regulates has immunity from antitrust law only when it is actively supervised by the state.  This allowed a successful lawsuit by unlicensed practitioners of teeth whitening, who dentists considered a competitive threat.

See also 

Bar examination
Driver license
First professional degree
General Securities Representative Exam
Gun license
License to practice law
Licentiate
Liquor license
Medical license
Professional licensure in the United States

References

External links 

Licensing Occupations: Ensuring Quality or Restricting Competition  by Morris M. Kleiner
Health Licensing Boards

Professional titles and certifications
Occupations